The 2005 Canadian Professional Soccer League season was the 8th season for the Canadian Professional Soccer League. The season began on May 21, 2005 and concluded on October 10, 2005 with Oakville Blue Devils defeating Vaughan Shooters 2-1 to win their first CPSL Championship. The final was played at Esther Shiner Stadium, which gave North York Astros a playoff wildcard match. In the regular season the Vaughan Shooters won their first Eastern Conference title, while Hamilton Thunder secured their third Western Conference title. The league increased in membership with the return of the Laval Dynamites. For the first time in the league's history the CPSL introduced a Women's Canada Cup tournament, which included 6 district all-star teams from the existing men's soccer districts.

Changes from 2004 season 
The season saw the resignation of chairman/president Vince Ursini in order to fully devote his time to his Ontario Soccer Association duties. His replacement was the CPSL management consultant Cary Kaplan to the newly created position of CPSL Commissioner. The league increased to 12 teams with the return of Laval Dynamites, while the Metro Lions relocated to the Halton Region territory to form the Oakville Blue Devils. The Brampton Hitmen were sold to Joe Fuliere, and renamed the team to the Brampton Stallions.

Teams

Final standings

Eastern Conference

Western Conference

CPSL Championship playoffs

Quarterfinals

Wildcard

Semifinals

CPSL Championship

All-Star Game  
The 2005 CPSL all-star match was against Rangers F.C. of the Scottish Premier League who were in Canada for a nine-day training camp before kicking off their season. The game was played at Varsity Stadium, but was closed to the public being only open to people associated to the league.

Top goal scorers

Updated: September 30, 2005

CPSL Executive Committee 
A list of the 2005 CPSL Executive Committee.

Awards  

The annual CPSL awards ceremony was held at the La Contessa Banquet Hall on October 9, 2005 in North York, Toronto. This was the first awards ceremony where the awards were distributed equally without a majority winner. Vaughan, Windsor, London, and North York each went home with two awards. Vaughan's Desmond Humphrey was voted the MVP, while team owner Tony De Thomasis was given the President of the Year award. London City went home with the Goalkeeper and Rookie of the Year awards with Haidar Al-Shaibani and Dennis Peeters as its recipients.

Former Detroit Titans alumni Aaron Byrd of Windsor Border Stars won the Golden Boot. Windsor's Fil Rocca was voted the Defender of the Year. The Coach of the Year went to former S.League, and USL A-League veteran Dejan Gluscevic, who went on to manage various national youth teams in Asia. North York Astros also received their first Fair Play award. Andrzej Jasinski the match official for the championship final was voted the Referee of the Year.

Women's Canada Cup  
A women's league debuted in 2005 which featured 6 all-star teams from the existing municipal soccer districts where the men's team competed. Throughout the regular season they played in 10 matches with London City Selects winning the regular season title. The finals featured London City against York Region Lady Shooters, where York Region won the championship.

Teams

References

External links
 Rocket Robin's Home Page of the 2005 CPSL Season

2005
2005 domestic association football leagues
Canadian Professional Soccer League